John T. Dillon (September 7, 1938 - February 28, 2023) is the retired chairman and chief executive officer of International Paper (1996–2003).

Early life
Dillon was born in 1938 in Schroon Lake, New York.  He earned an AAS in pre-professional forestry from Paul Smith's College in 1958, a BA from the University of Hartford in 1966 and an MBA from Columbia Business School in 1971.  He joined International Paper in 1965 as a sales trainee. He became President and COO in 1995 and Chairman and CEO in 1996.  He held these positions until he retired in 2003. And continued to accomplish many things throughout his life until his unfortunate passing on February 28th, 2023. (https://www.adirondackexplorer.org/stories/john-dillon-former-head-of-ip-passes)  

Prior to his appointment as chairman and CEO, Dillon served as president and chief operation officer of International Paper.

Dillon also serves as a director on other corporate boards, including: Caterpillar Inc. since 1997, DuPont since 2004, Kellogg Co. and Vertis. He is the vice chairman of Evercore Capital Partners.

He is also a member of The Business Council. Dillon is a former chairman of The Business Roundtable and American Forest and Paper Association, was a member of the President's Advisory Council on Trade Policy and Negotiations and served as chairman of the National Council on Economic Education.

Personal life
Dillon lives in Greenwich, Connecticut.

References

Paul Smith's College

Caterpillar Inc. people
Columbia Business School alumni
Kellogg's people
Living people
DuPont people
University of Hartford alumni
1938 births
International Paper
20th-century American businesspeople